Promechus whitei is a species of beetle belonging to the Chrysomelidae family.

Distribution
Promechus whitei occurs in Papua New Guinea.

References

 Universal Biological Indexer
 Coleoptera in the Swedish Museum of Natural History
 Zipcodezoo

Chrysomelinae
Beetles of Papua New Guinea
Beetles described in 1861
Taxa named by Joseph Sugar Baly